Rhipidarctia miniata is a moth in the family Erebidae. It was described by Sergius G. Kiriakoff in 1957. It is found in Cameroon.

References

Endemic fauna of Cameroon
Moths described in 1957
Syntomini